Middlesex is a rural locality in the local government areas (LGA) of Meander Valley, Central Coast and Kentish in the Launceston and North-west and west LGA regions of Tasmania. The 2016 census recorded a population of 4 for the state suburb of Middlesex.

History 
Middlesex is a confirmed locality.

Geography
The Campbell River, a tributary of the Forth River, forms part of the eastern boundary. The Forth River then continues the eastern boundary further to the north.

Road infrastructure 
Route C132 (Cradle Mountain Road / Belvoir Road) passes through the locality from north-east to south-west. A branch of this road provides access to Cradle Mountain.

References

Towns in Tasmania
Localities of Meander Valley Council
Localities of Central Coast Council (Tasmania)
Localities of Kentish Council